Cristiano Giusberti (born December 19, 1970), known by his primary stage name Technoboy, is an Italian hardstyle DJ and producer from Bologna.

Technoboy is a DJ and producer, who started out by playing vinyl in 1992. The genre he primarily plays is Hardstyle.

Cristiano's not only busy DJing, most of the time he's managing as well as producing for 'The Saifam Group' (Italy) which is a reputable record company. He began in 1992 as A&R manager at 'RECORD 66 Music Market for DJs', which he still manages today. He then started in 1996 as Producer and A&R at 'Arsenic Sound' until 1998, when he became a producer at ' The Saifam Group' and ever since 1999 he's A&R at the 'Alternative Sound Planet' label.

As an A&R manager, he supervises several well known labels such as Dance Pollution, Red Alert, Titanic Records, Green Force, BLQ, Bonzai Records Italy, Bonzai, Trance Progressive Italy and XTC Italy. He also produced numerous well known acts such as DJ Gius, Nitro, Klone, Pacific Link, The Hose, Spiritual Project, Giada, The KGB's, K-Traxx, Citizen, 2 Best Enemies, Hardstyle Masterz, Hunter, The Raiders, DJ Stardust, Droid, Atlantic Wave, Vector Two, Q-Zar, Ruff, Speedwave, Builder, and Psy man.

Technoboy also performed at events like Defqon.1 Festival, Bionic (UK), Sensation, Mondo (Edinburgh UK), Qlimax, Mystery Land, In Qontrol, Hard Bass, X-Qlusive, Fantazia (Glasgow), Decibel etc. and in Clubs like Hemkade 48, The Bridge, Index (Earthquake 2003), Tropicana, OXA, Ministry of Dance, Locomotion, Plaza di Christo, Vat 69 (2Fast4Trance), The Melkweg and Club Sans Souci (The Zone). His popularity continues to reach beyond the borders of Italy towards countries such as the Netherlands, Poland, Australia, Switzerland, Germany, Romania and the United States.

Some of Technoboy's biggest hits include 'War Machine', 'Rage', 'Into Deep', 'Oh My God', and the Qlimax 2008 Anthem 'Next Dimensional World'.

Discography

Releases
As Technoboy (selection):
Amino-Acid (12") - Titanic Records 1999
The Future (12") - Titanic Records 2000
Hardrive (12") - Titanic Records 2002
Ravers' Rules (12") - Titanic Records 2002
Tales From A Vinyl (12") - Titanic Records 2003
War Machine (12") - Titanic Records 2003
Titanic Remix Collection Volume 2 (12") - Titanic Records 2004
Atomic (12") - Titanic Records 2005
Titanic Remix Collection Volume 3 (12") - Titanic Records 2005
Guns 'N' Noses (12") - Titanic Records 2006
Into Deep (12") - Titanic Records 2006
Vita (12") - Titanic Records 2007
Rage (12") - Titanic Records 2008
Oh My God (12") - Titanic Records 2008
Next Dimensional World (12") - Qlimax 2008 Anthem
Ti Sento (12") - Titanic Records 2009
Put Some Grace (12") - Titanic Records 2009
The Undersound (Digital, MP3) - Titanic Records 2009
Catfight (Digital, MP3) - Titanic Records 2010
We Need Protection (Digital, MP3) - Titanic Records 2010
Vanilla Sky (Digital, MP3) - Titanic Records 2011
Re-Invent Yourself (Digital, MP3) - Titanic Records 2011
In Ya Face (Digital, MP3) - Titanic Records 2011
Nothing Nu (Digital, MP3) - Titanic Records 2012

As DJ Gius (selection):
Overcharge (12") - Titanic Records 1998
Overcharge (12") - Byte Progressive 1998
Byte Progressive Attack 2 (12") - Byte Progressive 1999
Dynamite (12") - Red Alert 2000
Dynamite (12") - A45 Music 2000
Amnesia (12") - EDM 2001
Amnesia (12") - Green Force 2001
Amnesia (12") - Electropolis 2001
De-Generation (12") - EDM 2001
De-Generation (12") - Spectra Records 2001
De-Generation (12") - Full Access 2001
Metal (12") - Green Force 2002
Puffganger (12") - Red Alert 2003
Definition Of A Track (12") - Dance Pollution 2004
Mega What (12") - Red Alert 2004
Jerk It! (12") - Blq Records 2005
V Like Venusian (12") - Blq Records 2006
Things To Do (12") - Blq Records 2007
Nerve (12") - Blq Records 2008

As Aceto (selection):
Go (12") - Dance Pollution
Sexy Gate (12") - Houzy Records
Hard Kick (12") - Dance Pollution 2000
Ritmo Musicale (12") - Airplay Records 2002

DJ-Mix
As Technoboy (selection):
Italian Hardstyle - Atlantis Records  2002
Italian Hardstyle 2 - Atlantis Records  2002
Italian Hardstyle 3 - (Doppel-CD) Atlantis Records  2003
Italian Hardstyle 4 - (Doppel-CD) Atlantis Records  2003
Italian Hardstyle Part 1 - (Doppel-CD) EMI Music 2003
Technodome 7 - S.A.I.F.A.M. 2003
The No. 1 Hardstyle DJ From Italy Vol. 2 - (Doppel-CD) EMI Music 2003
I'm Hardstyle - (Doppel-CD) Atlantis Records  2004
Italian Hardstyle 5 - (Doppel-CD) Atlantis Records  2004
Italian Hardstyle 6 - (Doppel-CD) Atlantis Records  2004
Technodome 8 - S.A.I.F.A.M. 2004
Technodome 9 - S.A.I.F.A.M. 2004
Blutonium Presents Hardstyle Vol. 7 - (Doppel-CD) EMI Music 2005
Hard Bass Vol. 5 - The Battles - (Doppel-CD)  Seismic  2005
I'm Hardstyle Vol. 2 - (Doppel-CD)  Atlantis Records   2005
Italian Hardstyle 7 - (Doppel-CD)  Atlantis Records   2005
Italian Hardstyle 8 - (Doppel-CD)  Atlantis Records   2005
Italian Hellstars - (Doppel-CD)  Atlantis Records   2005
Technodome 10 -  S.A.I.F.A.M.  2005
Technodome 11 -  S.A.I.F.A.M.  2005
Technodome 12 - The Ultimate Techno Adventure - S.A.I.F.A.M. 2006
Italian Hardstyle 9 - (Doppel-CD) Atlantis /The Saifam Group 2006
Italian Hardstyle 10 - (Doppel-CD) Atlantis /The Saifam Group 2006
Bassdusche Vol.3 (zusammen mit Ziggy X) - (Doppel-CD) Aqualoop Records 2007
Decibel 2007 - disc 01 Technoboy vs Zatox Seismic records 2007
The Battle Noisecontrollers vs. Technoboy Digidance 2008
Qlimax - Next Dimensional World Q-Dance.nl 2008
Hardbass Chapter 21 Mixed by Various Artists 2011

As Dj Gius (selection):
Technodome 2 - 2000
Transgression - 2000
Technodome 4 - 2001
Transgression 3 - 2001
Technodome 5 - 2002
Technodome 6 - 2002

Sampler incl. Remixes
As Technoboy (selection):
 Bitte ein Beat! - Beat 3 - EMI 2002
 Harder March 3 - Sony Music 2002
 ID&T Hardhouse - ID&T 2002
 Blutonium Presents Hardstyle Vol. 1 & 2 - EMI 2003
 Blutonium Presents Hardstyle Vol. 3 - Ministry of Sound 2004
 Defqon.1 2004 - Universal 2004
 Oxa Hardstyle Night Vol. 2 - Oxa 2005

As DJ Gius (selection):
 Club Rotation Vol. 8 - Warner 1999
 Atmoz 10 - The Sound Of The Clubs - EMI 2000
 Kernkraft 400 - Diverse 2000
 Trance Files 2000 The Final Yearmixes - ID&T 2000
 Hardstyle European Hard Trance - Capitol Records

External links
 Official Website
 Technoboy - Entry at TheDJList.com
 Technoboy at Discogs

Club DJs
Remixers
Italian DJs
Living people
1970 births
Hardstyle musicians
Electronic dance music DJs